Found, Lost, Found is a 1976 comedy novel by the British writer J.B. Priestley. It was Priestley's final novel, after a lengthy career.

Synopsis
A civil servant floating through life encounters a beautiful writer and falls in love. She then announces she is going to the country and challenges him to find her to prove they are meant to be together.

References

Bibliography
 Klein, Holger. J.B. Priestley's Fiction. Peter Lang, 2002.

1976 British novels
Novels by J. B. Priestley
British comedy novels
Novels set in England
Heinemann (publisher) books